The Ambassador Book Award (1986–2011) was presented annually by the English-Speaking Union. It recognized important literary and non-fiction works that contributed to the understanding and interpretation of American life and culture. Winners of the award were considered literary ambassadors who provide, in the best contemporary English, an important window on America to the rest of the world. A panel of judges selected books out of new works in the fields of fiction, biography, autobiography, current affairs, American studies and poetry.

The award was established in 1986. Winners included books by such notable authors as Tom Wolfe (1988), Joan Didion (1988), Raymond Carver (1989), Gore Vidal (1989), John Cheever (1992), John Updike (1997), Don Delillo (1998), Philip Roth (1999), and Annie Proulx (2000).

Recipients

1986
Fiction - Lake Wobegon Days, by Garrison Keillor
Fiction - The Accidental Tourist, by Anne Tyler

1987
American Studies - Cities on a Hill: A Journey Through Contemporary American Cultures, by Frances FitzGerald
American Studies - The Cycles of American History, by Arthur M. Schlesinger, Jr
Biography & Autobiography - The Life of Langston Hughes, Volume I: 1902-1941: I, Too, Sing America, by Arnold Rampersad
Fiction - Roger's Version, by John Updike
Special Citation - The Story of English by Robert McCrum, William Cran and Robert MacNeil

1988
American Arts & Letters - Collected Prose, by Robert Lowell
American Studies - Miami, by Joan Didion
Biography & Autobiography - Many Masks: A Life of Frank Lloyd Wright, by Brendan Gill
Fiction - The Bonfire of the Vanities, by Tom Wolfe
Special Citation - Blues by John Hersey

1989
American Arts & Letters - At Home: Essays 1982-1988, by Gore Vidal
American Studies - A Bright Shining Lie John Paul Vann and America in Vietnam, by Neil Sheehan
Biography & Autobiography - Parting the Waters: America in the King Years 1954-1963, by Taylor Branch
Fiction - Where I'm Calling From: New & Selected Stories, by Raymond Carver

1990
American Arts & Letters - The Writing Life, by Annie Dillard
American Studies - Among Schoolchildren, by Tracy Kidder
Biography & Autobiography - This Boy's Life: A Memoir, by Tobias Wolff
Fiction - Oldest Living Confederate Widow Tells All, by Allan Gurganus

1991
American Arts & Letters - The House of Barrymore, by Margot Peters
American Studies - A New York Life, by Brendan Gill
Biography & Autobiography - The House of Morgan, by Ron Chernow
Fiction - Killing Mr. Watson, by Peter Matthiessen

1992
American Arts & Letters - The Journals of John Cheever, by John Cheever
American Studies - The Crisis Years: Kennedy and Khrushchev : 1960 - 1963, by Michael Beschloss
Biography & Autobiography - Woodrow Wilson, by August Heckscher
Fiction - A Thousand Acres, by Jane Smiley
Special Prize - American Views: Essays on American Art by John Wilmerding

1993
American Arts & Letters - Up in the Old Hotel, by Joseph Mitchell
American Studies - Lincoln at Gettysburg: The Words That Remade America, by Garry Wills
Biography & Autobiography - Archibald MacLeish: An American Life, by Scott Donaldson
Fiction - Outerbridge Reach, by Robert Stone

1994
American Studies - Around the Cragged Hill A Personal and Political Philosophy, by George F. Kennan
Biography & Autobiography - W. E. B. Du Bois: Biography of a Race 1868-1919, by David Levering Lewis
Fiction - The Oracle at Stoneleigh Court, by Peter Taylor
Poetry - Tesserae & Other Poems, by John Hollander

1995
American Studies - Speak Now Against the Day: The Generation Before the Civil Rights Movement in the South, by John Egerton
Biography & Autobiography - No Ordinary Time Franklin and Eleanor Roosevelt: The Home Front in World War II, by Doris Kearns Goodwin
Fiction - The Collected Stories, by Grace Paley
Poetry - Like Most Revelations, by Richard Howard

1996
American Studies - Moving Violations: War Zones, Wheelchairs and Declarations of Independence, by John Hockenberry
Biography & Autobiography - Walt Whitman's America: A Cultural Biography, by David S. Reynolds
Fiction - All the Days and Nights, by William Maxwell
Poetry - Atlantis, by Mark Doty
Special Award - The Liar's Club by Mary Karr

1997
American Studies - Undaunted Courage: Meriwether Lewis, Thomas Jefferson and the Opening of the American West, by Stephen E. Ambrose
Biography & Autobiography - Taking on the World: Joseph and Stewart Alsop- Guardians of the American Century, by Robert W. Merry
Fiction - In the Beauty of the Lilies, by John Updike
Poetry - The Figured Wheel: New and Collected Poems, 1966 - 1996, by Robert Pinsky

1998
American Studies - American Visions, by Robert Hughes
Autobiography - Burning the Days: Recollection, by James Salter
Biography - American Sphinx: The Character of Thomas Jefferson, by Joseph Ellis
Fiction - Underworld, by Don DeLillo
Poetry - Black Zodiac, by Charles Wright

1999
American Studies - Slaves in the Family, by Edward Ball
Biography & Autobiography - N.C. Wyeth, by David Michaelis
Fiction - I Married a Communist, by Philip Roth
Poetry - The Collected Poems of Robert Penn Warren, by John Burt

2000
American Studies - Freedom from Fear: The American People in Depression and War, 1929-1945, by David M. Kennedy
Biography & Autobiography - Morgan: American Financier, by Jean Strouse
Fiction - Close Range: Wyoming Stories, by Annie Proulx
Literary Achievement - The Best Short Stories of the Twentieth Century by John Updike
Poetry - Vita Nova, by Louise Glück

2001
American Studies - In the Heart of the Sea: The Tragedy of the Whaleship Essex, by Nathaniel Philbrick
Biography & Autobiography - The Chief: The Life of William Randolph Hearst, by David Nasaw
Lifetime Achievement - Arthur M. Schlesinger, Jr.
Fiction - Angel on the Roof: The Stories of Russell Banks, by Russell Banks 
Poetry - American Poetry: The Twentieth Century, 2 vols., by Hass, Hollander, Kizer, Mackey, Perloff

2002
American Studies - Carry Me Home: Birmingham, Alabama, the Climactic Battle of the Civil Rights Revolution, by Diane McWhorter
Biography & Autobiography - John Adams, by David McCullough
Lifetime Achievement - Hortense Calisher
Fiction - Empire Falls, by Richard Russo
Poetry - The Darkness and the Light, by Anthony Hecht

2003
Fiction - Middlesex, by Jeffrey Eugenides
American Studies - In the Devil's Snare: The Salem Witchcraft Crisis of 1692, by Mary Beth Norton
Biography & Autobiography - Jesse James: Last Rebel of the Civil War, by T. J. Stiles
Poetry - Springing, New and Selected Poems, by Marie Ponsot
Lifetime Achievement - Edmund S. Morgan

2004
American Studies - They Marched into Sunlight, by David Maraniss
Biography & Autobiography - Hawthorne , A Life, by Brenda Wineapple
Fiction - The Time of Our Singing, by Richard Powers
Poetry - Robert Lowell: Collected Poems, edited by Frank Bidart & David Gewanter
Distinguished Achievement Award - Robert A. Caro

2005
American Studies - Washington's Crossing, by David Hackett Fischer
Biography & Autobiography - De Kooning: An American Master, by Mark Stevens
Fiction - Gilead, by Marilynne Robinson
Poetry - Collected Poems, by Donald Justice

2006
American Studies - A Great Improvisation: Franklin, France, and the Birth of America, by Stacy Schiff
Biography & Autobiography - American Prometheus: The Triumph and Tragedy of J. Robert Oppenheimer, by Kai Bird and Martin Sherwin
Fiction - Liberation: A Novel, by Joanna Scott 
Poetry - Migration, by W.S. Merwin

2007
American Studies - The Worst Hard Time: The Untold Story of Those Who Survived the Great American Dust Bowl, by Timothy Egan
Autobiography - The Afterlife: A Memoir, by Donald Antrim
Biography - The Most Famous Man in America: The Biography of Henry Ward Beecher, by Debby Applegate
Current Affairs - Fiasco: The American Military Adventure in Iraq, by Thomas E. Ricks
Fiction - The Collected Stories of Amy Hempel, by Amy Hempel
Poetry - Averno, by Louise Glück
Lifetime Achievement - Garry Wills

2008
American Studies - Storming the Gates of Paradise: Landscapes for Politics, by Rebecca Solnit 
Autobiography - Prime Green: Remembering the Sixties, by Robert Stone
Biography - Edith Wharton, by Hermione Lee
Fiction - The Reluctant Fundamentalist, by Mohsin Hamid
Poetry - Blackbird and Wolf, by Henri Cole
Lifetime Achievement - John Ashbery

2009
American Studies - A Summer of Hummingbirds, by Christopher Benfey
Biography and Autobiography - A Passion for Nature: The Life of John Muir, by Donald Worster
Current Affairs - The Dark Side: The Inside Story of How the War on Terror Turned into a War on American Ideals, by Jane Mayer
Fiction - Dangerous Laughter: Thirteen Stories, by Steven Millhauser
Poetry - Old War, by Alan Shapiro
Special Award - Toni Morrison

2010
American Studies - The Rebellion of Ronald Reagan: A History of the End of the Cold War, by James Mann
American Studies - Dancing in the Dark: A Cultural History of the Great Depression, by Morris Dickstein
Biography and Autobiography - Louis D. Brandeis: A Life, by Melvin Urofsky
Fiction - Let the Great World Spin, by Colum McCann
Poetry - Mercury Dressing, by J. D. McClatchy
Special Distinction Award - Thelonious Monk: The Life and Times of an American Original, by Robin D. G. Kelley

2011
American Studies - The Immortal Life of Henrietta Lacks, by Rebecca Skloot
Biography and Autobiography - The Publisher: Henry Luce and His American Century, by Alan Brinkley
Fiction - The Collected Stories of Deborah Eisenberg, by Deborah Eisenberg
Poetry - Every Riven Thing: Poems, by Christian Wiman
Special Distinction Award - The Memory Chalet, by Tony Judt

References

External links
Ambassador Book Award, official website.

 
American fiction awards
Awards established in 1986
Awards disestablished in 2011
American non-fiction literary awards
American poetry awards
Biography awards